Maureen F. McHugh (born February 13, 1959) is an American science fiction and fantasy writer.

Career 

McHugh's first published story was published as a Twilight Zone under a male pseudonym in 1988. It was followed by a pair of publications under her own name in Isaac Asimov's Science Fiction Magazine in 1989. Since then, she has written four novels and over twenty short stories. 

Her first novel, China Mountain Zhang (1992), was nominated for both the Hugo and the Nebula Award, and won the James Tiptree, Jr. Award. In 1996 she won a Hugo Award for her short story "The Lincoln Train" (1995). Her short story collection Mothers and Other Monsters was shortlisted as a finalist for the Story Prize in December, 2005.

McHugh has worked as a writer and/or managing editor for numerous alternate reality game projects, including Year Zero and I Love Bees for 42 Entertainment. Since 2009 she has been a partner at No Mimes Media, an alternate reality game company that she co-founded with Steve Peters and Behnam Karbassi.

Novels 

China Mountain Zhang (1992) James Tiptree, Jr. Award, Locus Award, Lambda Literary Award
Half the Day Is Night (1994)
Mission Child (1998) Review by Jo Walton.
Nekropolis (2001) Review by James Schellenberg.

Stories (Partial List) 

"Kites" (1989)
"Baffin Island" (1989)
"The Queen of Marincite" (1990)
"Render unto Caesar" (1992)
"Protection" (1992)
"The Missionary's Child" (1992)
"The Beast" (1992)
"Tut's Wife" (1993) (collected in Mike Resnick's 1993 alternate history anthology Alternate Warriors) 
"A Foreigner's Christmas in China" (1993)
"Whispers" (1993)
"A Coney Island of the Mind" (1993)
"Virtual Love" (1994)
"Nekropolis" (1994)
"The Ballad of Ritchie Valenzuela" (1994) (collected in Mike Resnick's 1994 alternate history anthology Alternate Outlaws)
"The Lincoln Train" (1995) (collected in Mike Resnick's 1997 alternate history anthology Alternate Tyrants) Hugo Award, Locus Award
"Joss" (1995)
"In the Air" (1995)
"Learning to Breathe" (1995)
"Homesick" (1996)
"The Cost to Be Wise" (1996)
"Interview: On Any Given Day" (2001)
"Presence" (2002)
"Ancestor Money" (2003)
"Eight-Legged Story" (2003)
"Frankenstein's Daughter" (2003)
"Cannibal Acts" (2017)

Collections
Mothers and Other Monsters, Small Beer Press (2005)
After the Apocalypse, Small Beer Press (2011) Shirley Jackson Award, Best Single-Author Collection.

Alternate Reality Games
Year Zero: Writer (2007)
Last Call Poker: Writer and Managing Editor (2005)
I Love Bees: Writer and Managing Editor (2004)

References

External links 
 Maureen McHugh's blog
 No Mimes Media
 

1959 births
20th-century American novelists
20th-century American women writers
21st-century American novelists
21st-century American women writers
American science fiction writers
American women novelists
American women short story writers
Hugo Award-winning writers
Lambda Literary Award winners
Living people
Women science fiction and fantasy writers
20th-century American short story writers
21st-century American short story writers
Alternate reality games
Transmediation